Motta Baluffi is a comune (municipality) in the Province of Cremona in the Italian region Lombardy, located about  southeast of Milan and about  southeast of Cremona.

Motta Baluffi borders the following municipalities: Cella Dati, Cingia de' Botti, Roccabianca, San Daniele Po, Scandolara Ravara, Torricella del Pizzo.

References

Cities and towns in Lombardy